August Kuehn House was a historic home located in downtown Evansville, Indiana.  It was built in 1864. It has been demolished.

It was listed on the National Register of Historic Places in 1982.

References

Houses on the National Register of Historic Places in Indiana
Houses completed in 1864
National Register of Historic Places in Evansville, Indiana
Houses in Evansville, Indiana